The North Ossetia-Alania Opera and Ballet Theatre (officially the National State Opera and Ballet Theatre of the Republic of North Ossetia-Alania), also known as the Mariinsky Theatre Alania Branch, is a national opera and ballet theatre in Vladikavkaz, Russia.

History
The theater was founded as the North Ossetian Music and Drama Theatre in 1958, before functioning officially as an opera and ballet from 1972.

Since 2005, the theater has hosted the International Music Festival "Larisa Gergieva Invites", and also the International Mariinsky Vladikavkaz Festival.

In 2012, the RNO-Alania Opera and Ballet Theatre was recognized by the republic, and it was awarded the title of "National Theatre", and subsequently became a branch of Mariinsky Theatre in 2017.

The theatre's current Artistic Director is Larisa Gergieva, and its past conductors include Valery Gergiev and Tugan Sokhiev.

Gallery

References 
 Official site of the Alania Mariinsky Theatre
 Information on the site of the Ministry of Culture RNO-Alania
 RNO-Alania Opera and Ballet Theatre

Theatres in Russia